The Danes started with a system of units based on a Greek pous ("foot") of  which they picked up through trade in the late Bronze Age/early Iron Age. Some early standards of measure can be recovered from measured drawings made of the  Hjortspring boat, which though dating to the early Iron Age exemplifies plank-built vessels of the late Bronze Age and the  Nydam ship. Thwarts are typically spaced about 3 fod apart.

King Christian V of Denmark introduced an office to oversee weights and measures, a justervæsen. This was first led by the royal mathematician Ole Rømer, who established a national system of weights and measures on May 1st, 1683.  Rømer's system, which he updated in 1698, was based on the Rhine foot. Its definitions included the following: 
 the Danish mile as 24,000 Rhineland feet (i.e. 4 minutes of arc latitude)
 the Danish ell (alen) as 2 Rhineland feet (630 mm)
Rømer also suggested a pendulum definition for the foot (although this would not be implemented until after his death), and invented an early temperature scale.

The metric system was introduced in 1907.

Length
See also Danish rute (rod)
 mil – Danish mile. Towards the end of the 17th century, Ole Rømer, Gerardus Mercator and other contemporaries of the great Dutch cartographer Thisus began following  Claudius Ptolemy in connecting the mile to the great circle of the earth, and Roemer defined it as 12,000 alen. This definition was adopted in 1816 as the Prussian Meile. The coordinated definition from  1835 was 7.532 km. Earlier, there were many variants, the most commonplace the Sjællandsk miil of 17,600 alen or 11.13 km (6.92 mi).
 palme – palm, for circumference, 8.86 cm (3.49 in)
 alen – ell, 2 fod
 fod – foot, about 313.85 mm (12.356 inches) in most recent usage. Defined as a Rheinfuss 314.07 mm (12.365 inches) from 1683, before that 314.1 mm (12.366 in) with variations.
 rut – 5026 mm, 16 fod.
 kvarter – quarter,  alen
 tomme – thumb (inch),  fod
 linie – line,  tomme
 skrupel – scruple,  linie

Area
 tønde land – Barrel of land, 8 skæpper land

Volume
 smørtønde – barrel of butter, from 1683, 136 potter
 korntønde – barrel of corn (grain), from 1683 144 potter

Weight
 pund – pound, from 1683 the weight of  cubic fod of water, 499.75 g (1.1 lb)

Miscellaneous
 dusin – dozen, 12
 snes – score, 20
 skok – 60
 ol – 4 , 80
 gros – gross, 144

References

See also
 Weights and measures
 Historical weights and measures
 SI

Customary units of measurement
Units of measurement by country